Designer Depot is a Canadian deep discount department store and liquidation store that sold brand names at prices 25 to 60% below regular department and specialty store prices. It was created in November 2004 as a division of retailer Hudson's Bay Company (HBC). It was sold by HBC in April 2008 to the INC Group of Companies.

The first location opened as part of the Vaughan Mills Mall in Vaughan, Ontario. Weekly shipments of clothing originated from Fairweather and associated chains. The merchandise was sourced through order cancellations by other retailers, excess stock, liquidations, not passing 100% quality check or bankruptcies.

Their slogan was "Designer Labels. Depot Prices."

See also 
 Hudson's Bay Company

References

Clothing retailers of Canada